Historical reliability of the Quran concerns the question of the historicity of the described or claimed events in the Quran.

The Quran is viewed to be the scriptural foundation of Islam and is believed by Muslims to have been sent down by Allah (God) and revealed to Muhammad by the angel Jibreel (Gabriel). Muslims have not used historical criticism in the study of the Quran, but they have used textual criticism in a similar way used by Christians and Jews. It has been practiced primarily by secular, Western scholars such as John Wansbrough, Joseph Schacht, Patricia Crone, and Michael Cook, who set aside doctrines of the Quran's divinity, perfection, unchangeability, etc., accepted by Muslim scholars, and instead investigate the Quran's origin, text, composition, and history.

In the Muslim world, scholarly criticism of the Quran can be considered an apostasy. Scholarly criticism of the Quran, is thus, a nascent field of study in the Islamic world.

Scholars have identified several pre-existing sources for some Quranic narratives. The Quran assumes its readers' familiarity with the Christian Bible and there are many parallels between the Bible and the Quran. Aside from the Bible, the Quran includes legendary narratives about Dhu al-Qarnayn, apocryphal gospels, and Jewish legends.

Textual history

Early manuscripts
In the 1970s, 14,000 fragments of Quran were discovered in the Great Mosque of Sana'a, the Sana'a manuscripts. About 12,000 fragments belonged to 926 copies of the Quran, the other 2,000 were loose fragments. The oldest known copy of the Quran so far belongs to this collection:According to Sadeghi and Bergmann, the results indicated that the parchment had a 68% (1σ) probability of belonging to the period between 614 CE to 656 CE. It had a 95% (2σ) probability of belonging to the period between 578 CE and 669 CE. The carbon dating was applicable to the lower text.But paleography suggest a date from mid to latter half of the 7th century CE.Upper text dated between end of 7CE and beginning of the 8CE.

The German scholar Gerd R. Puin has been investigating these Quran fragments for years. His research team made 35,000 microfilm photographs of the manuscripts, which he dated to early part of the 8th century. Puin has not published the entirety of his work, but noted unconventional verse orderings, minor textual variations, and rare styles of orthography. He also suggested that some of the parchments were palimpsests which had been reused. Puin believed that this implied an evolving text as opposed to a fixed one.

In 2015, some of the earliest known Quranic fragments, dating from between approximately AD 568 and 645, were identified at the University of Birmingham. Islamic scholar Joseph E. B. Lumbard of Hamad Bin Khalifa University in Qatar has written in the Huffington Post in support of the dates proposed by the Birmingham scholars. Professor Lumbard notes that the discovery of a Qur'anic text that may be confirmed by radiocarbon dating as having been written in the first decades of the Islamic era, and includes variations in the  “under text.” recorded in the Islamic historiographical tradition .

Quran and History

Creation narrative

The Quran contains a creation narrative and may refer to the world being created in six days (yawm), although this is highly debatable. In Sūrah al-Anbiyāʼ, the Quran states that "the heavens and the earth were of one piece" before being parted. God then created the landscape of the earth, placed the sky above it as a roof, and created the day and night cycles by appointing an orbit for both the sun and moon. Some Muslim apologists, like Zakir Naik and Adnan Oktar advocate creationism and contemporary Islamic scholar Yasir Qadhi believes that the idea that humans evolved is against the Quran. Most Muslims do not accept the theory of evolution, although there are substantial differences among countries (from <10% acceptance in Egypt to about 40% in Kazakhstan). Some Muslims point to a verse in the Quran as evidence for Evolution “when He truly created you in stages ˹of development˺?” Verse 71:14. Evolution is taught in many Islamic countries, and some scholars have tried to reconcile the Quran and evolution.

Samiri
Quran recounts a story of the golden calf, where it mentions that Samiri, a rebellious follower of Moses, created the calf while Moses was away for 40 days on Mount Sinai, receiving the Ten Commandments. Due to the fact that as-Samiri can mean the Samaritan, some believe that his character is a reference to the worship of the golden calves built by Jeroboam of Samaria, conflating the two idol-worshiping incidents into one.

Alexander the Great legends

Quran also employs popular legends about Alexander the Great called Dhul-Qarnayn ("he of the two horns") in the Quran.
The story of Dhul-Qarnayn has its origins in legends of Alexander the Great current in the Middle East in the early years of the Christian era. According to these the Scythians, the descendants of Gog and Magog, once defeated one of Alexander's generals, upon which Alexander built a wall in the Caucasus mountains to keep them out of civilised lands (the basic elements are found in Flavius Josephus).

The reasons behind the name "Two-Horned" are somewhat obscure: the scholar al-Tabari (839–923 CE) held it was because he went from one extremity ("horn") of the world to the other, but it may ultimately derive from the image of Alexander wearing the horns of the ram-god Zeus-Ammon, as popularised on coins throughout the Hellenistic Near East. The wall Dhul-Qarnayn builds on his northern journey may have reflected a distant knowledge of the Great Wall of China (the 12th century scholar al-Idrisi drew a map for Roger of Sicily showing the "Land of Gog and Magog" in Mongolia), or of various Sassanid Persian walls built in the Caspian area against the northern barbarians, or a conflation of the two.

Dhul-Qarneyn also journeys to the western and eastern extremities ("qarns", tips) of the Earth. In the west he finds the sun setting in a "muddy spring", equivalent to the "poisonous sea" which Alexander found in the Syriac legend.  In the Syriac original Alexander tested the sea by sending condemned prisoners into it, but the Quran changes this into a general administration of justice. In the east both the Syrian legend and the Quran have Alexander/Dhul-Qarneyn find a people who live so close to the rising sun that they have no protection from its heat.

"Qarn" also means "period" or "century", and the name Dhul-Qarnayn therefore has a symbolic meaning as "He of the Two Ages", the first being the mythological time when the wall is built and the second the age of the end of the world when Allah's shariah, the divine law, is removed and Gog and Magog are to be set loose. Modern Islamic apocalyptic writers, holding to a literal reading, put forward various explanations for the absence of the wall from the modern world, some saying that Gog and Magog were the Mongols and that the wall is now gone, others that both the wall and Gog and Magog are present but invisible.

Death of Jesus
   

Quran maintains that Jesus was not actually crucified and did not die on the cross. The general Islamic view supporting the denial of crucifixion was probably influenced by Manichaenism (Docetism), which holds that someone else was crucified instead of Jesus, while concluding that Jesus will return during the end-times.

Despite these views, theologians maintain that the Crucifixion of Jesus is a fact of history.
The view that Jesus only appeared to be crucified and did not actually die predates Islam, and is found in several apocryphal gospels.

Irenaeus in his book Against Heresies describes Gnostic beliefs that bear remarkable resemblance with the Islamic view:

Irenaeus mentions this view again:
He appeared on earth as a man and performed miracles. Thus he himself did not suffer. Rather, a certain Simon of Cyrene was compelled to carry his cross for him. It was he who was ignorantly and erroneously crucified, being transfigured by him, so that he might be thought to be Jesus.  Moreover, Jesus assumed the form of Simon, and stood by laughing at them. Irenaeus, Against Heresies.

Another Gnostic writing, found in the Nag Hammadi library, Second Treatise of the Great Seth has a similar view of Jesus' death:

and also:

Coptic Apocalypse of Peter, likewise, reveals the same views of Jesus' death:

However, Islamic scholar Mahmoud M. Ayoub and historian of religion Gabriel Said Reynolds disagree with the mainstream interpretation of the Quranic narrative of Jesus' death, arguing that the Quran nowhere disputes that Jesus died.

See also
 Historicity of the Bible
 Criticism of the Quran
 History of the Quran
 Corpus Coranicum
 Syriac Infancy Gospel
 Noah in Islam

References

Notes

Citations

Bibliography
 
 
 
 

 

</ref>

</ref>

 

 

Quran
Historicity of religion
Quran-related controversies
Religious texts